Owen Madigan (born 4 April 1942) is  a former Australian rules footballer who played with Footscray and Richmond in the Victorian Football League (VFL).

Notes

External links 		
		
		
		
		
		
		
Living people		
1942 births		
		
Australian rules footballers from Victoria (Australia)		
Western Bulldogs players		
Richmond Football Club players
Yarraville Football Club players